King Zhuangxiang of Qin, personal name Yiren
Rong Yiren (1916-2005), entrepreneur and former Vice-President of the People's Republic of China
 Jocelyn Wang (Wang Yiren), Taiwan actress and news anchor
 Yiren, a singer in the South Korean girl group Everglow

See also
 Yeren